A golf ball is a ball used in the game of golf.

Golf ball may also refer to:

 Golf Ball, a painting by the Roy Lichtenstein
 A typeball introduced with the IBM Selectric typewriter
 The 'Golf Balls', nickname for the radomes of the RAF Fylingdales base in North Yorkshire, England